South Carolina Highway 63 (SC 63) is a  state highway in the U.S. state of South Carolina. The highway is designated on a north–south direction, though it is signed as and located physically on an east–west orientation, from U.S. Route 278 (US 278) in Varnville to SC 64 Business (SC 64 Bus.) in Walterboro.

Major intersections

Islandton alternate route

South Carolina Highway 63 Alternate (SC 63 Alt.) was an alternate route that existed east-southeast of Islandton. It was established in February 1938 as a partial renumbering of SC 63. It was decommissioned in 1947 and downgraded to secondary roads. Its west–east portion is known today as Varnadoe Road. Its south–north portion is known as Adnah Church Road.

See also

References

External links

SC 63 at Virginia Highways' South Carolina Highways Annex
Former SC 63 ALT at Virginia Highways' South Carolina Highways Annex

063
Transportation in Hampton County, South Carolina
Transportation in Colleton County, South Carolina